Baby Boomer is an unlicensed 1989 action video game created by Color Dreams for the Nintendo Entertainment System. It was developed during 1988 and released in 1989 in North America. In Brazil, Color Dreams later sold the game under license to Gradiente.

Summary 

Baby Boomer decided to leave his crib and set out for the dangerous wilderness outside of his house.

As Boomer crawls across the screen toward numerous dangers, such as birds of prey and bottomless pits, the player uses the NES Zapper to shoot hazards before they hurt Boomer. Shooting birds kills them; shooting clouds makes them form ice bridges over pits. Level environments include a graveyard, the "Pearly Gates" of heaven, and the pits of hell. Up to two players can participate simultaneously and use the controller along with the Zapper.

This game is the first game by Color Dreams. Like the company's other unlicensed games, rather than the typical grey NES cartridge, Baby Boomer is baby blue with a design altered to bypass the design patent of the licensed carts.

References

1989 video games
Unauthorized video games
Color Dreams games
Fictional infants
Light gun games
Nintendo Entertainment System games
Nintendo Entertainment System-only games
Video games about children
Video games developed in the United States
Cooperative video games
Multiplayer and single-player video games